Fabric, written by playwright Henry Ong, is the only known dramatization of the 1995 El Monte Thai Garment Slavery Case.  It was produced by the Company of Angels in 2010, in partnership with the Thai Community Development Center to commemorate the 15th anniversary of the landmark case. In 2015, it was reprised and presented at the Pasadena Playhouse as part of a month-long celebration of the 20th anniversary of the case.

Background
On August 2, 1995 in El Monte, California, 72 Thai nationals were discovered working and living in an apartment complex ringed with barbed wire and spiked fences, sewing clothes for major retailers and manufacturers.  Some of the captives had been held for as long as seven years by the leader of a human trafficking ring, “Auntie Suni.” The story made national and international headlines as the first case of modern-day slavery since the abolishment of slavery in the United States.<ref>Martorell, Chanchanit and Beatrice "Tippe" Morlan (2011). Thais in Los Angeles”, p. 25. Arcadia Publishing, Los Angeles. .</ref>

Production
Playwright Henry Ong, upon reading an account of the raid in the Los Angeles Times, contacted Chanchanit Martorell, Executive Director of the Thai Community Development Center.  Martorell agreed to put Ong in touch with the people involved in the case, including the Thai garment workers.

Ong received a City of Los Angeles Cultural Affairs Department grant to write the play.  In addition to interviews with the principal players, Ong did extensive research and visited the Smithsonian Institution that created an exhibit on the history of garment workers to collect additional data and information.  He developed the play over the years through workshops and readings. Singapore Repertory Theatre staged Fabric'' in a world premiere in 2000.  This was followed by a production by Nomad Theater in Surrey, England the next year.  Company of Angels produced it in 2010, in association with Thai Community Development Center, in commemoration of the 15th anniversary of the Thai garment workers slavery case.

Synopsis
The play interweaves two stories. The first follows a group of Thai nationals who are lured by a human trafficking ring into coming to America to work in a garment factory, masterminded by a Thai national (aka Auntie Suni) who was assisted by her sons and daughters in-law.  Once here, these workers found themselves confined in an apartment building that had been converted into an underground sewing shop. Under the thumb of Auntie Suni, the men and women were forced to work long hours (from 7 a.m. to midnight) with no weekend breaks or holidays to pay off their debts to the traffickers.

The other thread in the narrative involves a law enforcement investigation. A garment worker escapes from the premise. She speaks about her predicament to an Immigration Officer, who is familiar with Thai culture, having worked in Thailand for many years and is married to a Thai woman.

Through investigations by both the Immigration and Naturalization Service; and the State Labor Commission, a raid is planned on the apartment complex. Auntie Suni, the ring leader, and her family members are arrested and brought to justice. The workers are freed and allowed to live in the United States.

References

Asian-American plays
American plays
Plays set in Los Angeles
Plays about slavery
2010 plays
History of slavery in California